Senator Stanford most commonly refers to Leland Stanford, US Senator from California

Senator Stanford may also refer to:
 Charles Stanford, New York state senator brother of Leland Stanford
 Derek Stanford, Washington state senator